Andrei Pavlenko (born April 6, 2000) is a Belarusian professional ice hockey right winger who is currently an unrestricted free agent.

Career 
Pavlenko spent two seasons playing for the Edmonton Oil Kings of the Western Hockey League. He signed with Dinamo Minsk of the KHL on July 11, 2019.

Pavlenko most recently played for Dinamo Minsk of the Kontinental Hockey League (KHL).

Career statistics

Regular season and playoffs

International

References

External links

2000 births
Living people
Belarusian ice hockey right wingers
HC Dinamo Minsk players
Edmonton Oil Kings players
Ice hockey people from Minsk
Yunost Minsk players